Balmerino Abbey, or St Edward's Abbey, in Balmerino, Fife, Scotland, was a Cistercian monastic community which has been ruinous since the 16th century.

History

It was founded from 1227 to 1229 by monks from Melrose Abbey with the patronage of Ermengarde de Beaumont and King Alexander II of Scotland. It remained a daughter house of Melrose. It had approximately 20 monks at the beginning of the sixteenth century, but declined in that century. In December 1547 it was burned by an English force, and allegedly damaged again in 1559 by Scottish Protestants as part of the Reformation's destruction of perceived idolatrous structures.

In combination with several centuries of plundering for building stone the entire main abbey is absent and only the smaller support structures to the north survive, most notable of which are the fan-vaulted cloisters.

In 1606–07 its name was revived as a secular lordship for James Elphinstone, 1st Lord Balmerino.

Current condition

In 1910 the landowner employed Francis William Deas to survey the building and execute a program of repairs and consolidation.

The abbey is now under the stewardship of the National Trust for Scotland, and a small entrance fee is requested at an honesty box, with no ticket booth or manned presence on-site. The ruin consists of a substantial section of the east wall of the main church. More substantial ruins of some of the associated buildings exist to the side of this but access is currently prohibited due to their poor state of repair.

As of summer 2007, a sign on-site states that entrance fees will be used to contribute towards a possible future stabilization of these ruins to improve safety for visitors to enter once again.

The ruins are designated a scheduled monument.

Burials
 Ermengarde de Beaumont, Queen of Scotland

See also
 Abbot of Balmerino
 Lord Balmerino
 Scheduled monuments in Fife

Notes

Bibliography

 Cowan, Ian B. & Easson, David E., Medieval Religious Houses: Scotland With an Appendix on the Houses in the Isle of Man, Second Edition, (London, 1976), pp. 72–3
 Dixon, Piers, 'Balmerino Abbey: Resurvey and Topographic Analysis', in T. Kinder (ed.), Life on the Edge: the Cistercian Abbey of Balmerino, Fife (Citeaux, Commentarii cistercienses 59)(Forges-Chimay 2008), pp. 163–67
 Fawcett, Richard, 'Balmerino Abbey: the Architecture', in T. Kinder (ed.), Life on the Edge: the Cistercian Abbey of Balmerino, Fife (Citeaux, Commentarii cistercienses 59)(Forges-Chimay 2008), pp. 81–118
 Hammond, Matthew, 'Queen Ermengarde and the Abbey of St Edward, Balmerino', in T. Kinder (ed.), Life on the Edge: the Cistercian Abbey of Balmerino, Fife (Citeaux, Commentarii cistercienses 59)(Forges-Chimay 2008), pp. 11–35
 Kerr, Julie, 'Balmerino Abbey: Cistercians on the East Coast of Fife', in T. Kinder (ed.), Life on the Edge: the Cistercian Abbey of Balmerino, Fife (Citeaux, Commentarii cistercienses 59)(Forges-Chimay 2008), pp. 37–60
 Márkus,Gilbert, 'Reading the Place-Names of a Monastic Landscape', in T. Kinder (ed.), Life on the Edge: the Cistercian Abbey of Balmerino, Fife (Citeaux, Commentarii cistercienses 59)(Forges-Chimay 2008), pp. 119–62
 Oram, Richard D., 'A Fit and Ample Endowment? The Balmerino Estate, 1228-1603', in T. Kinder (ed.), Life on the Edge: the Cistercian Abbey of Balmerino, Fife (Citeaux, Commentarii cistercienses 59)(Forges-Chimay 2008), pp. 61–80
 Watt, D.E.R. & Shead, N.F. (eds.), The Heads of Religious Houses in Scotland from the 12th to the 16th Centuries, The Scottish Records Society, New Series, Volume 24, (Edinburgh, 2001), pp. 12–15

Religious buildings and structures completed in 1229
Christian monasteries established in the 13th century
1229 establishments in Scotland
Religious organizations established in the 1220s
Cistercian monasteries in Scotland
History of Fife
Religion in Fife
1603 disestablishments in Scotland
National Trust for Scotland properties
Tourist attractions in Fife
Scheduled Ancient Monuments in Fife
Former Christian monasteries in Scotland
1227 establishments in Scotland